Tee for Two  is a 1945 American one-reel Technicolor animated cartoon and is the 20th Tom and Jerry short, first released to theaters on July 21, 1945 by Metro-Goldwyn Mayer. The short is directed by William Hanna and Joseph Barbera, composed by Scott Bradley, and animated by Ray Patterson, Irven Spence, Pete Burness, and Kenneth Muse.

Tee for Two is often noted for its climactic scene involving Tom's strong reaction from a bee attack, which has been described as the "largest and most gruesome reaction in [Tom and Jerry] to date".

Plot
A wrecked golf course has a signboard which says "Please Replace Divots". Tom, implied to have caused the damage, is trying to hit his golf ball out of a gigantic divot as he sinks, until he finally hits the ball on his 51st try. When Tom takes the flag out of the hole, the ball rolls in but bounces out; Jerry is living in the hole. After throwing the ball directly into Tom's eye in jest, Tom swings his golf club at the mouse and misses. Jerry temporarily escapes but is caught when Tom hits his golf ball onto Jerry's head, knocking him out.

Using Jerry as a tee, Tom places a ball on his head. Tom takes his shot, which cuts out a huge divot while Jerry manages to hold onto Tom's golf club. Tom looks around to see where his ball is, but Jerry whistles and holds up the ball. Tom then puts Jerry through the ball cleaner. After spitting soapy water in Tom's face, Jerry is forced into holding the tee with the ball on it. Tom's next shot backfires and breaks his teeth.

In the next scene, Tom's ball is in front of two skinny, long trees. Tom cannot stand behind his ball to hit it, so he is forced to split the trees. After he hits the ball, it ends up in a tree and triggers a "slot machine" display on the trunk. Three lemons appear on the reels; when Tom looks inside an avalanche of golf balls comes out of the tree, covering him. Annoyed, Tom returns to his game, but Jerry has replaced his ball with a woodpecker egg. After Tom hits the egg, the woodpecker hatches from the egg and comes back to peck on Tom's head.

Tom tries to hit a real golf ball, but Jerry has cleaved it to make it useless. In retaliation, Tom places the ball's shell on his head and swings at Jerry, landing him right next to the hole. Jerry, with the ball still on his head, tries to gain balance but Tom blows at and forcibly inserts him in the hole. Tom then takes out his scorecard and falsely writes down "3" in his card, but Jerry expresses disapproval, causing him to write "33" instead.

A series of violent antics eventually lead to Jerry placing a bee's nest on Tom's head. As bees swarm around Tom's head Tom slowly realizes the situation, dives out of the tree, and hides in a bush. Jerry, wanting to humiliate the cat, runs over the bush with a lawn mower revealing Tom shaved like a poodle. Tom, seeing the bees coming towards him, jumps out of his skin and runs off. The bees then chase Tom over a lake, where a stick of bamboo is seen; Tom hides underwater and uses the stick like a snorkel for breathing. Jerry whistles to get the bees' attention and leads them to the stick. A bee looks through the stick to see Tom, who spits water in its face in defiance. Enraged, and with Jerry's help, the bees dive-bomb through it, causing Tom to jump out and let out a scream with stinging bees in his mouth. Tom makes a run for it before they can fly after him while Jerry takes a driver and hits the golf ball, which hits Tom at a far distance, knocking him out.

Production
Like every short of Tom and Jerry during its first two decades, Tee for Two is directed by William Hanna and Joseph Barbera, with its score composed by Scott Bradley. The short is animated by Ray Patterson, Irven Spence, Pete Burness, and Kenneth Muse.

Patterson animated the scene of Tom scoring his first hole with Jerry as the golf ball. For Spence, he animated the beginning scene of Tom desperately trying to hit his golf ball. For Burness, he animated the scenes of Jerry assisting Tom by both being the tee and holding up the tee. For Muse, he animated the scenes of Tom's first encounter with Jerry and Tom in the lake. Both Spence and Muse split the responsibilities of animating the chase of Tom by the bees.

Spence has expressed his love for, and frustration towards, the sport of golf in his diary, which is assumed to inform his animation for the short.

Reception
Animator Mark Kausler has described Tom's reaction from the bee attack to be "the most terrifying drawing ([by the animator] Ken Muse) of Tom being stung... accompanied by the most anguished scream ever put on film." Animation historian and video editor Devon Baxter has also described Tom's scream to be "the largest and most gruesome reaction in the series to date". For writer and historian Michael Samerdyke, he viewed the climactic scene as illustrative of the natural incorporation of Tex Avery's style of comedy into Hanna and Barbera's own animated shorts. However, animation historian Michael Barrier saw otherwise, and stated that "the sheer scale of Tom's reaction–so big it's preposterous–cancels out his pain."

Home media
"Tom and Jerry's Greatest Chases, Vol. 1" (2000)
"Tom and Jerry: The Classic Collection" (2004) (Region 2 DVD)
"Tom and Jerry Spotlight Collection" (2004)
"Tom and Jerry Golden Collection, Volume One" (2011)

References

External links

1945 short films
1940s American animated films
1940s animated short films
1945 comedy films
1945 animated films
1945 films
Animated films about cats
Animated films about mice
Animated films without speech
Golf animation
Short films directed by Joseph Barbera
Short films directed by William Hanna
Tom and Jerry short films
American comedy short films
Films produced by Fred Quimby
Films scored by Scott Bradley